Throne of Damnation is an EP by British power metal/heavy metal band Cloven Hoof, released in 2010. It features three new songs and two are re-recordings of existing Cloven Hoof songs. Russ North recorded the vocals before he quit the band in late 2009, and his parts were subsequently re-recorded by his replacement, Matt Moreton.

Track listing
 "Running Man" – 4:12
 "Whore of Babylon" – 4:47
 "Freak Show" – 6:32
 "Prime Time" – 3:57
 "Night Stalker" –3:47

Personnel
Matt Moreton - Vocals
Ben Read - Guitar
Lee Payne - Bass
Jon Brown - Drums

External links
 Cloven Hoof official site
 Cloven Hoof official download site

2010 EPs
Cloven Hoof (band) albums